Kamyshenka is a rural locality (a selo) in Altaysky Selsoviet, Tabunsky District, Altai Krai, Russia. The population was 240 as of 2013. There are 4 streets.

Geography 
Kamyshenka is located 30 km west of Tabuny (the district's administrative centre) by road. Granichnoye is the nearest rural locality.

References 

Rural localities in Tabunsky District